Enrique A. Manalo (born July 21, 1952) is a Filipino diplomat currently serving as the Secretary of Foreign Affairs under the Marcos administration since July 1, 2022. He previously served in an acting role under the Duterte administration from March 9 to May 17, 2017 when Perfecto Yasay Jr.'s ad-interim appointment confirmation was rejected by the Commission on Appointments due to citizenship issues. He also previously served as Philippine Ambassador to the United Kingdom from 2011 to 2016, Undersecretary for Policy of the Department of Foreign Affairs from 2016 to 2020, and the 21st Permanent Representative of the Philippines to the United Nations from 2020 to 2022.

Early life and education
Manalo was born on July 21, 1952 in Manila to diplomats Armando Manalo and Rosario Manalo (whom the latter served as the ambassador of the Philippines to France and Special Representative of the Philippines to the ASEAN Intergovernmental Commission on Human Rights). Manalo attended the University of the Philippines Manila, where he obtained both a bachelor's and a master's degree in economics.

Career
Manalo has been working with the Department of Foreign Affairs since 1979. He began his career in the foreign service as the Special Assistant to the Office of the Deputy Minister of Foreign Affairs from 1979 to 1981. After that, he completed his first tour of duty at the Philippine Mission to the United Nations in Geneva, Switzerland until 1986. From 1986 to 1989, he was the First Secretary and consul at the Philippine Embassy in Washington, D.C. and then served as the Special Assistant to the First Undersecretary of the Department of Foreign Affairs until 1992.

From 1992 to 1998, he was the Minister Counselor at the Philippine Mission to the United Nations in New York and thereafter, as Assistant Secretary for European Affairs. He was back at the Philippine Mission to the United Nations in New York from 2000 to 2003 serving as its Deputy Permanent Representative (with rank of Ambassador). He then served as the Permanent Representative of the Philippine Mission to the United Nations and other International Organizations in Geneva, Switzerland from 2003 to 2007. From 2005 to 2007, he served as the elected chairman of the 41st and 42nd session of the World Intellectual Property Organization General Assembly.

In 2007, he was appointed DFA Undersecretary for Policy, serving until 2010. From 2010 to 2011, he served as the Philippine Ambassador to Belgium and Luxembourg and head of the Philippine Mission to the European Union. He served as the ambassador of the Philippines to the United Kingdom from 2011 to 2016 and a non-resident ambassador to Ireland from 2013 to 2016.

In April 2016, he was appointed again as Undersecretary for Policy and on March to May 2017, and served as acting Secretary of Foreign Affairs after the rejection of Perfecto Yasay Jr.'s ad-interim appointment by the Commission on Appointments, with the post of Secretary of Foreign Affairs subsequently taken by former senator Alan Peter Cayetano upon the latter's confirmation by the Commission on Appointments on May 17, 2017. In August 2018, Manalo was appointed by President Duterte as the ambassador of the Philippines to Germany and on February 2020, he was appointed as the 21st Permanent Representative of the Philippines to the United Nations, of which has been left vacant since October 12, 2018 after former UN Permanent Representative Teodoro Locsin Jr. left the post to become the Secretary of Foreign Affairs (replacing Cayetano, whom the latter resigned as Secretary of Foreign Affairs on October 17, 2018 upon running for the post of representative of Taguig–Pateros in the May 2019 elections, of which Cayetano eventually won). Manalo's appointment as permanent representative of the Philippines to the United Nations was confirmed by the Commission on Appointments on March 4, 2020 and later, he presented his credentials to the Secretary-General of the United Nations António Guterres on July 27, 2020.

In July 2022, Manalo was appointed by President Bongbong Marcos to serve as the Secretary of Foreign Affairs, having previously served the post in an acting capacity in the Duterte administration, of which he was sworn in on July 1, 2022, succeeding Teodoro Locsin Jr., and eventually vacating the post of permanent representative of the Philippines to the United Nations on the same day (of which the latter post would later be filled up by former Philippine ambassador to the United Kingdom, Antonio M. Lagdameo on July 7, 2022; succeeding Manalo).

Awards and recognition

Honors and titles conferred on Ambassador Manalo in recognition of his exceptional and distinguished service to the Republic of the Philippines include:

 Order of Lakandula with rank of Grand Cross (Bayani) (2018)
 Order of Sikatuna with rank of Grand Cross (Datu) (Gold Distinction) (2010)
 Gawad Mabini with rank of Grand Cross (Dakilang Kamanong) (2017)

Personal life
Manalo is married to Pamela Louise Hunt-Manalo. They have two sons.

See also
List of foreign ministers in 2017
List of foreign ministers in 2022

References

External links

1952 births
Living people
21st-century Filipino politicians
Ambassadors of the Philippines to Belgium
Ambassadors of the Philippines to the European Union
Ambassadors of the Philippines to Ireland
Ambassadors of the Philippines to Luxembourg
Ambassadors of the Philippines to the United Kingdom
Bongbong Marcos administration cabinet members
Benigno Aquino III administration personnel
Duterte administration cabinet members
Filipino diplomats
Grand Crosses of the Order of Lakandula
Permanent Representatives of the Philippines to the United Nations
People from Manila
Secretaries of Foreign Affairs of the Philippines
University of the Philippines Manila alumni